= Kandlein of Regensburg =

German-Jewish moneylender

Kandlein of Regensburg (d. after 1358) was a German–Jewish moneylender.

Kandlein was a widow, and after her husband's death she inherited much of his wealth. She was a prominent businessperson and among the largest taxpayers in Regensburg. Additionally, she was elected as one of the appointed leaders of the Regensburg Jewish community, an office she held for at least two years. She was also chosen to be the leader of the group that set the taxes for the Jews, and regulated which Jews should be allowed to settle in Regensburg, and how much they should pay for the privilege.
